Surviving Picasso is a 1996 Merchant Ivory film directed by James Ivory and starring Anthony Hopkins as the famous painter Pablo Picasso. It was produced by Ismail Merchant and David L. Wolper. Ruth Prawer Jhabvala's screenplay was loosely based on the biography Picasso: Creator and Destroyer by Arianna Stassinopoulos Huffington.

Plot
The young Françoise meets Picasso in Nazi-occupied Paris, where Picasso is complaining that people broke into his house and stole his linen, rather than his paintings. It shows Françoise being beaten by her father after telling him she wants to be a painter, rather than a lawyer. Picasso is shown as often not caring about other people's feelings, firing his driver after a long period of service, and as a womanizer, saying that he can sleep with whomever he wants.

The film is seen through the eyes of his lover Françoise Gilot (Natascha McElhone). As the producers were unable to get permission to show the works of Picasso in the film, the film is more about Picasso's personal life rather than his works, and where it does show paintings, they are not his more famous works. When Picasso is shown painting Guernica, the camera sits high above the painting, with the work only slightly visible.

The film depicts several of the women who were important in Picasso's life, such as Olga Khokhlova (played by Jane Lapotaire), Dora Maar (played by Julianne Moore), Marie-Thérèse Walter (played by Susannah Harker), and Jacqueline Roque (played by Diane Venora).

Cast
 Anthony Hopkins as Pablo Picasso
 Natascha McElhone as Françoise Gilot
 Julianne Moore as Dora Maar
 Joss Ackland as Henri Matisse
 Dennis Boutsikaris as Kootz
 Peter Eyre as Sabartes 
 Peter Gerety as Marcel 
 Susannah Harker as Marie-Thérèse Walter
 Jane Lapotaire as Olga Khokhlova
 Joseph Maher as Daniel-Henry Kahnweiler
 Bob Peck as Françoise's Father 
 Joan Plowright as Françoise's Grandmother
 Diane Venora as Jacqueline Roque
 Dominic West as Paulo Picasso
 Laura Aikman as Maya Widmaier-Picasso
 Nigel Whitmey as Pierre
 Leon Lissek
 Andreas Wisniewski
 Anthony Milner
 Tom Fisher
 Vernon Dobtcheff as Sergei Diaghilev
 Hamish McColl
 Sandor Elès, Brigitte Kahn, Olegar Fedoro as Party Guests
 Rose English 
 Judith Sharp

Production
The film was shot in Paris and southern France.

Reception
The film received mixed reviews. On Rotten Tomatoes it has a rating of 35% based on reviews from 20 critics. On Metacritic it has a score of 55 out of 100, based on reviews from 18 critics, indicating "mixed or average reviews".

References

External links 
 
 
 

1996 films
1990s biographical drama films
American biographical drama films
Biographical films about painters
Films directed by James Ivory
Films with screenplays by Ruth Prawer Jhabvala
Cultural depictions of Pablo Picasso
Cultural depictions of Henri Matisse
Merchant Ivory Productions films
Films shot at Pinewood Studios
The Wolper Organization films
Films set in France
Films shot in France
Films shot in Paris
Films set in Paris
Films based on biographies
1996 drama films
Films produced by David L. Wolper
1990s English-language films
1990s American films